Lukas Fredrik Christian Nielsen (23 December 1885 – 29 September 1964) was a Danish gymnast who competed in the 1908 Summer Olympics, in the 1912 Summer Olympics and perhaps also in the 1920 Summer Olympics.

In 1908 he finished fourth with the Danish team in the team event. He was part of the Danish team, which won the bronze medal in the gymnastics men's team, free system event in 1912. According to the IOC medal database he was also a member of the Danish team in 1920, which won the gold medal in the gymnastics men's team, free system event.

References

1885 births
1964 deaths
Danish male artistic gymnasts
Olympic gymnasts of Denmark
Gymnasts at the 1908 Summer Olympics
Gymnasts at the 1912 Summer Olympics
Gymnasts at the 1920 Summer Olympics
Olympic gold medalists for Denmark
Olympic bronze medalists for Denmark
Olympic medalists in gymnastics
Medalists at the 1920 Summer Olympics
Medalists at the 1912 Summer Olympics